The European Academy of Optometry and Optics (EAOO) is a membership organization for the development of optometry and optics in Europe.

The EAOO organizes an annual conference.

See also
 World Council of Optometry

References

External links
 EAOO website
 

Organizations established in 2009
European medical and health organizations
Optometry
Optics institutions
International organisations based in London